Alexandre de Almeida Silva Júnior (born 23 January 2001), commonly known as Juninho, is a Brazilian footballer who plays as a centre midfielder for Orlando City B, on loan from Vasco da Gama.

Career statistics

Club

Vasco da Gama

Titulo Copa do Brasil sub-20

References

2001 births
Living people
Brazilian footballers
Association football midfielders
Campeonato Brasileiro Série B players
CR Vasco da Gama players
Orlando City B players
People from Nova Iguaçu
Sportspeople from Rio de Janeiro (state)